Alexander M. Korsunsky is a specialist in the  engineering microscopy of materials and structures for optimisation of design, durability and performance. He has made numerous contributions to science in the areas of materials mechanics, microscopy, residual stress evaluation and modelling, eigenstrain theory and structural integrity. He founded the Multi-Beam Laboratory for Engineering Microscopy (MBLEM) in the University of Oxford, Department of Engineering Science, and Centre for In situ Processing Studies (CIPS) in the Research Complex at Harwell. His research group pursues studies of a wide range of natural and engineered materials, from flax fibres, seashell nacre and human dental tissues to zirconia ceramics and porcelain veneers, advanced aerospace alloys, films and coatings, and materials for energy. 
 
Alexander received his degree of Doctor of Philosophy (DPhil) from Merton College, University of Oxford, following undergraduate education in theoretical physics. He has held visiting positions at the National University of Singapore, University Roma Tré, and ENSICAEN in France. His current appointment is Professor of Engineering Science at the University of Oxford and Trinity College, Oxford.

He is Editor-in-Chief of Materials & Design, a major Elsevier journal (2021 IF 7.991).

See also
 The Korsunsky Work-of-Indentation Approach

References

Living people
Fellows of Trinity College, Oxford
British mechanical engineers
Year of birth missing (living people)